Chokehold: Policing Black Men is a 2017 non fiction book by Paul Butler. It was nominated for the NAACP Image Award for Outstanding Literary Work in the Nonfiction category in 2018.

References 

2017 non-fiction books
Criminal justice reform in the United States
Non-fiction books about racism
The New Press books